Anglisides is a village in the Larnaca District of Cyprus, located 4 km north of Anafotida and 20 km southwest of Larnaca.

References

Communities in Larnaca District